The Uruguay men's national volleyball team represents Uruguay in international volleyball competitions and friendly matches. In the 1950s the squad twice won a silver medal (1951 and 1956) at the South American Championship. The dominant forces in men's volleyball on the South American continent are Brazil and Argentina.

References 
Sports123

Volleyball
National men's volleyball teams
Men's sport in Uruguay